Rosario (Oeste Santafesino; in English: Santa Fe Western) is a former railway station and the terminus of the Santa Fe Western Railway company in Rosario, province of Santa Fe, Argentina.

The station is located in the southeast of Rosario (southern Santa Fe), within present-day Parque Urquiza, at the junction of Chacabuco St. and 9 de Julio St., not far from the ravine of the Paraná River.

History

The station was built in 1883 by the Santa Fe Western Railway,. When the Central Argentine Railway company bought SFWR in 1900, the terminus was renamed as "Rosario Este", setting it aside to handle exclusively cargo and cattle.

As Argentina's railway system declined, the rails were removed and the terminus, like many other stations, was abandoned and deteriorated. The Municipality of Rosario took charge of it and preserved what was left. Its long-delayed restoration was concluded in May 2007. The Municipality turned the building into a culture center, housing the video library of the Rosario Audiovisual Center (Centro Audiovisual Rosario, CAR). The old station also serves as a community center for senior retired citizens, and a meeting place for a group of sculptors. Offices of the Municipal Culture Secretariat will be moved here as well, and an auditorium will be set up for public activities and film projection.

References

Railway stations in Rosario, Santa Fe
Railway stations opened in 1883
Railway stations closed in 1900
Defunct railway stations in Argentina